Duroc may refer to:

Duroc pig, an older breed of American domestic pig
Duroc (Paris Métro), a station on the Paris Métro Line 10 and Line 13
Géraud Duroc, duc de Frioul, a French general
 was a French aviso that wrecked on 13 August 1856 on Mellish Reef, 160 leagues off the coast of New Caledonia).